The Opihi Pickers was an island reggae group from Hawaii that blend island, reggae, and contemporary music.

The group is composed of vocalist and ukulele player Imua Garza, Imua's brother Hoku Garza (guitar and ukulele), their cousins Kahale Morales (bass) and Kevin Okimoto (guitar and vocals).  
 
The Opihi Pickers began as recording artists in 1998 while still young teens.  They broke through to a wider audience in 2001 with the success of their hit song "Old Fashioned Touch".

In early 2008 they announced that the band would be disbanding in June 2008.

Discography 

 1998: Fresh Off The Rocks
 2001: Beginnings
 2003: All For You
 2004: Together As One
 2006: An Old Fashioned Christmas
 2007: OP VI
 2008: Greatest Picks - Best of the Opihi Pickers

See also
Hawaiian music
Opihi

References

External links
 Official Opihi Pickers Site
'Ukulele tabs, lessons, chord charts, and info

Opihi pickers
Musical groups established in 1993
1993 establishments in Hawaii
Hawaiian ukulele players